Sphindus is a genus of cryptic slime mold beetles in the family Sphindidae. There are at least three described species in Sphindus.

Species
These three species belong to the genus Sphindus:
 Sphindus americanus LeConte, 1866
 Sphindus crassulus Casey, 1898
 Sphindus trinifer Casey, 1898

References

Further reading

External links

 

Sphindidae
Articles created by Qbugbot